Éber Luís Cucchi, (born September 20, 1981 in Caxias do Sul), is a Brazilian footballer where he plays as a forward.

Club career
Éber was signed by Tianjin Teda F.C. at the beginning of the 2008 Chinese Super League season and quickly became a vital member of the team when he scored 14 goals in 20 matches to become the top goal scorer in the league. He achieved that despite being banned for 8 games during the season for a violent tackle against Li Zhihai in a game against Guangzhou F.C. on June 25, 2008 and was fined 8000 yuan. With the club reaching its best position in several years and the chance to play for the 2009 AFC Champions League for the first time, expectations were high for Éber to repeat his success; however, he only achieved two goals throughout the 2009 Chinese Super League season and was released by the club at the end of the season.

Éber joined another Chinese Super League team in Jiangsu Sainty on February, 2010. His move was extremely disappointing as he struggled to find the net and was released during the summer league break. Éber returned to Brazil to join lower league side Veranópolis before having another chance to join a Chinese team in Qingdao Jonoon at the beginning of the 2011 Chinese Super League.

Honours
Tianjin Teda
Chinese Super League 2008 Top Scorer (14 goals)

References

External links
 
 Player stats at Sodasoccer.com
 Player stats at Sohu.com

1981 births
Living people
Brazilian footballers
Brazilian expatriate footballers
Canoas Sport Club players
Tianjin Jinmen Tiger F.C. players
Jiangsu F.C. players
Qingdao Hainiu F.C. (1990) players
Esporte Clube Juventude players
Expatriate footballers in China
Brazilian expatriate sportspeople in China
Chinese Super League players
Association football forwards